Koshava Island is the easternmost island in the Zed group off Varna Peninsula, northeastern Livingston Island in the South Shetland Islands, Antarctica. The island is ice-free, extending . The area was visited by early 19th century sealers.

The island is named after the settlement of Koshava in northwestern Bulgaria.

Location
Bulgarian mapping in 2009.

See also 
 Composite Gazetteer of Antarctica
 List of Antarctic islands south of 60° S
 Scientific Committee on Antarctic Research
 Territorial claims in Antarctica

Maps
 Livingston Island to King George Island.  Scale 1:200000.  Admiralty Nautical Chart 1776.  Taunton: UK Hydrographic Office, 1968.
 L.L. Ivanov. Antarctica: Livingston Island and Greenwich, Robert, Snow and Smith Islands. Scale 1:120000 topographic map. Troyan: Manfred Wörner Foundation, 2009.  (Second edition 2010)
Antarctic Digital Database (ADD). Scale 1:250000 topographic map of Antarctica. Scientific Committee on Antarctic Research (SCAR). Since 1993, regularly upgraded and updated.

References

 Koshava Island. SCAR Composite Gazetteer of Antarctica.
 Bulgarian Antarctic Gazetteer. Antarctic Place-names Commission. (details in Bulgarian, basic data in English)

External links
 Koshava Island. Copernix satellite image

Islands of Livingston Island
Bulgaria and the Antarctic